The Aeronca L was a 1930s American cabin monoplane designed and built, in small numbers, by Aeronca Aircraft. It differed significantly from other Aeronca planes by the use of radial engines, streamlining, and a cantilever low wing.

Design and construction
Quite unlike other Aeronca designs, the Model L was a "cantilever" (no external struts for bracing) low-wing monoplane, that featured side-by-side seating in a completely enclosed cabin. The design reflected the greater attention being paid to aerodynamics in the period, including large wheel spats for the fixed undercarriage and a Townend ring for the engine. The aircraft was of mixed-construction with a welded steel fuselage and wings with spruce spars and ribs, all covered with fabric.

Initial attempts to use Aeronca's own engines proved inadequate, and the company turned to small radial engines from other suppliers, particularly neighboring Cincinnati engine manufacturer LeBlond.

Operational history
The Model L was mainly flown by private pilot owners. The plane was not a big seller.  Difficulty with engine sources, and a destructive flood, in 1937, at Aeronca's factory at Cincinnati's Lunken Airport, took the energy out of the program, and Aeronca went back to high-wing light aircraft.

With the end of sales to Aeronca, LeBlond  sold their engine-manufacturing operation to an Aeronca-rival planemaker, Kansas City-based Rearwin Aircraft, who resumed production of the engines under the brand name "Ken-Royce," largely for use in Rearwin planes.

Variants
LA
Fitted with a  LeBlond 5DE engine, 9 built
LB
Fitted with an  LeBlond 5DF engine, 29 built
LC
Fitted with a  Warner Scarab Jr engine, 15 built
LCS
LD
Fitted with a  Lambert R-266 5-cyl. radial engine

Surviving aircraft
The EAA AirVenture Museum in Oshkosh, Wisconsin has a 1937 Aeronca LC in its collection.

The Western Antique Aeroplane & Automobile Museum of Hood River, Oregon, has an airworthy Aeronica LC. Aeronca LB N16271 was in final stages of restoration as of January of 2015; Aeronca LC NC17442 (cn 2056) is also on display in the museum.

Specifications (Model LC)

Notes

References

Taylor, J. H. (ed) (1989) Jane's Encyclopedia of Aviation. Studio Editions: London. p. 31
Holcomb's Aerodrome

Low-wing aircraft
Single-engined tractor aircraft
1930s United States civil utility aircraft
Aeronca aircraft
Aircraft first flown in 1935